Jubilee Lake is a  man-made lake in the Umatilla National Forest in the northern corner of Union County in the U.S. state of Oregon. Its basin spans Union, Umatilla, and Wallowa counties. A U.S. Forest Service campground at the lake has 53 sites and is the most heavily used campground in the Umatilla National Forest. Fishing and swimming are the most popular activities at the lake. A  trail around the shore was designated a National Recreation Trail in 1981.

Rainbow trout are stocked in the lake for anglers, and youth fishing event is held at the lake each year.

See also
List of lakes of Oregon

References

External links
 Photos of the lake by Evan Stroum
 Featured lakes on the Umatilla National Forest: U.S. Forest Service

Lakes of Union County, Oregon
Reservoirs in Oregon
Umatilla National Forest